Diderma stellulum is a species of slime mould in the family Didymiaceae, first described by Marie Leonore Farr in 1988. It  is found in Brazil, in tropical semideciduous forest.

References

External links 
 Description of Diderma stellulum at DiscoverLife

Myxogastria
Taxa named by Marie Leonore Farr
Taxa described in 1988